Christel is a unisex given name, and may refer to:

Christel Augenstein (21st century), German politician
Christel Bertens (born 1983), Dutch bobsledder and athlete
Christel Haekk (born 1948), politician in Ontario, Canada
Christel Khalil (born 1987), Emmy Award-nominated American actress
Christel Kimbembe (born 1982), Congolese football defender
Christel Lau (born 1944), German field hockey player
Christel Marott (1919–1992), Danish Illustrator and Sculptorist
Christel Meinel (21st century), former East German cross country skier
Christel Schaldemose (born 1967), member of the European Parliament
Christel Takigawa (born 1977), Japanese television presenter
Christel Wegner (born 1947), German communist politician

See also

Christl
Christol

Unisex given names